Jerzy Treder (14 April 1942 – 2 April 2015) was a Polish philologist and linguist, focusing on Kashubian studies, among other interests. He was born in Biała Rzeka, Rumia, Poland . In 1987-1990 he was deputy director of the Institute of Polish Philology in Gdańsk University.

In 1973 he earned a degree of Doctor in Humanities, with the thesis:  Toponimia byłego powiatu puckiego ("Toponymy of the Former Puck Powiat"). In 1987 he earned the dr.hab. in linguistics for Ze studiów nad frazeologią kaszubską (na tle porównawczym). He received the title of professor in 1994 and the position of professor ordinarius in 2002.

Treder died at the age of 72 on April 2, 2015, twelve days before his 73rd birthday.

Books
70 lat „Poradnika Językowego”. Zawartość pisma w latach 1901-1970 [Z przedmową W. Doroszewskiego], PWN, Warszawa 1972
Toponimia byłego powiatu puckiego, Gdańsk 1977
Słownik nazw terenowych byłego powiatu puckiego, Zesz. Nauk. WH UG. Prace językoznawcze nr 5, Gdańsk 1977 [printed 1978]
Pochodzenie Pomorzan oraz choronimów i etnonimów z obszaru Pomorza Gdańskiego, Gdańsk 1982
Ze studiów nad frazeologią kaszubską (na tle porównawczym), UG, Gdańsk 1986
Frazeologia kaszubska a wierzenia i zwyczaje (na tle porównawczym), Muzeum Piśmiennictwa i Muzyki Kaszubsko-Pomorskiej. Towarzystwo *Przyjaciół Ziemi Wejherowskiej, Wejherowo 1989
Toponimia powiatu wejherowskiego, Pomorskie Monografie Toponomastyczne nr 14, GTN, Gdańsk 1997
Nazwy ptaków we frazeologii i inne studia z frazeologii i paremiologii polskiej, Wyd. UG, Gdańsk 2005
Historia kaszubszczyzny literackiej. Studia, Wyd. UG, Gdańsk 2005
Spòdlowô wiédza ò kaszëbiznie, Oficyna Czec, Gdańsk 2009

Co-authored
J. Treder, E. Breza, Zasady pisowni kaszubskiej, Gdańsk 1976, ss. 52; wyd. 2. przejrzane i poszerzone. Na podstawie postanowień Komisji do Spraw Pisowni Kaszubskiej w składzie [...] oprac. E. Breza i J. Treder, Wyd. ZG ZK-P, Gdańsk 1975; wyd. 2. przejrzane i poszerzone, Gdańsk 1984, ss. 72.
E. Breza, J. Treder, Gramatyka kaszubska. Zarys popularny, Gdańsk 1981, ss. 185.
J. Borzyszkowski, J. Mordawski, J. Treder, Historia, geografia, język i piśmiennictwo Kaszubów. Historia, geògrafia, jãzëk i pismienizna Kaszëbów, Wyd. M. Rożak, Gdańsk 1999, ss. 190 + 2 nlb.
J. Drwal, W. Odyniec, J. Treder, Góra – wieś i parafia. Środowisko, dzieje, język, Urząd Gminy Wejherowo, Wejherowo 1998, ss. 136 + 1 nlb.
 (collection) Język kaszubski. Poradnik encyklopedyczny, ed. J. Tredera, UG i Oficyna Czec, Gdańsk 2002.
 (collection) Język kaszubski. Poradnik encyklopedyczny. ed. J. Treder, Rev. 2. corrected and expanded UG, Oficyna Czec, Gdańsk 2006.
Kaszubi, wierzenia i twórczość: ze Słownika Sychty, Oficyna Czec, 2000 (rework of Bernard Sychta's Dictionary of Kashubian Dialects)
Wstãpné słowò, w: Kaszëbsczé dzeje ë dzysészé żëcé. Dokôzë kaszëbsczi prozë. Zwësk Òglowòpòlsczégò Kònkùrsu prozatorsczégò miona Jana Drzéżdżóna z lat 2000–2003. Ùszëkòwôł... J. Tréder, Wejrowò 2004 .
Kashubian to Polish. Language Contacts

References

1942 births
Kashubians
Polish people of German descent
Polish philologists
Linguists from Poland
2015 deaths